Mystic Mirror is an album by White Sun, released in 2022. The album earned a Grammy Award for Best New Age, Ambient or Chant Album.

References

2022 albums
Grammy Award for Best New Age Album